Yerdos Akhmadiyev (Ердос Жаксимбинович Ахмадиев, born March 6, 1985) is a Kazakh cross-country skier who has competed since 2010. Akhmadiyev was selected to carry the Kazakh flag during the opening ceremony of the 2014 Winter Olympics in Sochi, Russia.

Akhmadiyev is also scheduled to carry the Kazakh flag during the opening ceremony of the 2017 Asian Winter Games.

See also
Kazakhstan at the 2014 Winter Olympics

References

External links
 
 
 

1985 births
Living people
Cross-country skiers at the 2014 Winter Olympics
Olympic cross-country skiers of Kazakhstan
Kazakhstani male cross-country skiers
Tour de Ski skiers
Cross-country skiers at the 2017 Asian Winter Games
Asian Games medalists in cross-country skiing
Asian Games silver medalists for Kazakhstan
Medalists at the 2017 Asian Winter Games